Pops Mohamed (born Ismail Mohamed-Jan) is a South African multi-instrumentalist, jazz musician and producer.

Born in Benoni, Gauteng, Pops Mohamed had a career in music that was the logical outcome of an early exposure at Dorkay House to the likes of Abdullah Ibrahim and Kippie Moeketsi. Mohamed's father was a Muslim of Portuguese and Indian heritage and his mother was of Xhosa people and Khoisan heritage. He grew up in the Indian community of Johannesburg. He started his first band The Valiants, at the age of 14. Known by fans as the "Minister of Music", he plays a wide variety of instruments: African mouth bow, bird whistle, berimbau, didgeridoo, guitar, keyboard, kora, and the thumb piano. He is also known for his wide range of musical styles which include kwela, pop, and soul. He produced Finding One's Self, the late Moses Taiwa Molelekwa's award-winning album.

Pops has also performed regularly with and sits on the board of the Johannesburg Youth Orchestra Company

Discography
 Kalamazoo - 1991
 Sophiatown Society - 1992 (with Morris Goldberg)
 Ancestral Healing - 1995
 How Far Have We Come - 1996
 Music With No Name - 1996
 Society Vibes - 1997 (with McCoy Mrubatha)
 Timeless - 1997
 Millennium Experience - 2000 (with Zena Edwards)
 Pops Mohamed Meets "The LondonSound Collective" - 1999
 Africa Meltdown - 2001
 Yesterday, Today And Tomorrow - 2002
 Mood Africa - 2005

References

1949 births
Living people
South African people of Indian descent
South African jazz musicians
South African Muslims
South African people of Portuguese descent
South African people of Xhosa descent